TV Globo (formerly Rede Globo) produced its first telenovela for the 11 pm time slot in 2011. These telenovelas often have nudity, violence, and coarse language. The longest telenovela was Os Dias Eram Assim, which ran for 88 episodes. They were initially remakes from previous productions but lately they are original productions.

2010

2020

Reruns

See also 
 List of 8/9 PM telenovelas of Rede Globo
 List of Rede Globo telenovelas

References 

TV Globo telenovelas
Rede Globo 23
Brazil culture-related lists
Brazilian television-related lists